Ultra Modern Nursery Rhymes is the only album released by the short-lived group Terry, Blair & Anouchka.

Overview
Terry, Blair & Anouchka were formed shortly after the dissolution of Terry's previous musical project the Colourfield. All three members shared a love for '60s pop, as well as kitschy mainstream pop, as evidenced on the trio's cover of Captain & Tennille's "Love Will Keep Us Together". "Missing" was released as a single in November 1989, followed by "Ultra Modern Nursery Rhyme" in February 1990. Both singles reached the lower end of the UK Singles Chart. Ultra Modern Nursery Rhymes was released in February 1990 to little attention. The group split shortly afterwards.

Release
The album did not chart in the UK. "Missing" reached No. 75 in November 1989, and "Ultra Modern Nursery Rhyme", the second and final single charted at No. 77 the following year. The album was re-released in 2004 by Cherry Red Records with two additional bonus tracks.

Track listing

Personnel
Terry, Blair & Anouchka
 Blair Booth - keyboards, vocals
 Anouchka Grose - guitar, backing vocals
 Terry Hall - vocals
Technical
 Jeremy Green - arrangements 
 Bob Sargeant - producer on tracks 1 to 7, 9, 10
 Jeremy Green - producer on tracks 4 to 6, 8, 9

References

Terry, Blair & Anouchka albums
1990 debut albums
Chrysalis Records albums
Albums produced by Bob Sargeant